Worship in Hinduism is an act of religious devotion usually directed to one or more Hindu deities.  A sense of Bhakti or devotional love is generally invoked. This term is probably a central one in Hinduism, but a direct translation from the Sanskrit to English is difficult. Worship takes a multitude of forms depending on geography and language. Worship is not confined to any place of worship, and it will often incorporate personal reflection, music, dance and poetry. Hindus usually perform worship in temples or at home to achieve some specific end or to integrate the body, mind and spirit. The aim is to live a pure life in order to help the performer reincarnate into a higher being.

Deities

Within Hinduism many personal gods (Ishvaras) are worshipped as murtis. These beings are either aspects of the supreme Brahman, Avatars of the supreme being, or significantly powerful entities known as devas. The exact nature of belief in regards to each deity varies between differing Hindu denominations and philosophies. Often these beings are depicted in humanoid or partially humanoid forms, complete with a set of unique and complex iconography in each case. These deities may be different but they are generally all considered forms of the one god (Brahman). These deities and their Pujas (religious rituals) provide one of the ways to communicate with this one divinity.

Murti

In Hinduism, a murti typically refers to an image or statue which expresses a Divine Spirit (murta). Devotional (bhakti) practices centered on cultivating a deep and personal bond of love with God often include veneration of murtis. Acts of devotion can include awakening the murti in the morning and making sure that it "is scrubbed, clothed, and garlanded." Furthermore, the building of a temple for the murti is considered the highest act of devotion.  Some Hindu denominations like Arya Samaj and Brahmo Samaj, however, reject it, equating it with an idol worship.

Puja

Pūjā or alternative transliteration Pooja (Sanskrit: reverence, honour, adoration, or worship) is a religious ritual performed by Hindus as an offering to various deities, distinguished persons, or special guests. It is done on a variety of occasions and settings, from daily puja done in the home, to temple ceremonies and large festivals, or to begin a new venture. Puja is modeled on the idea of giving a gift or offering to a deity or important person and receiving their blessing (Ashirvad). The puja ritual is performed by Hindus worldwide.

Hindu deities can be worshiped in both visible and invisible forms. With the help of idol, invisible gods are worshiped as a visible gods. Whenever wishes, devotee may pray god of their choice out of various Hindu deities, .

Aarti

Aarti is when a Hindu religious ritual of worship, a part of puja, in which light from wicks soaked in ghee (purified butter) or camphor is offered to one or more deities. Aarti is generally performed one to five times daily, and usually at the end of a puja (in South India) or bhajan session (in North India). It is performed during almost all Hindu ceremonies and occasions. It involves the circulating of an 'Aarti plate' or 'Aarti lamp' around a person or deity and is generally accompanied by the singing of songs in praise of that deva or person (many versions exist). In doing so, the plate or lamp is supposed to acquire the power of the deity. The priest circulates the plate or lamp to all those present. They cup their down-turned hands over the flame and then raise their palms to their forehead - the purificatory blessing, passed from the deva's image to the flame, has now been passed to the devotee.

Darśana

Darśana or Darshan is a Sanskrit term meaning "sight" (seeing or beholding;), vision, apparition, or glimpse. It is most commonly used for theophany - "manifestation / visions of the divine" in Hindu worship, e.g. of a deity (especially in image form), or a very holy person or artifact. One could also "receive" darshana or a glimpse of the deity in the temple, or from a great saintly person, such as a great guru.

Homa, Havan and Yajna

Homa (also known as homam or havan) is a Sanskrit word which refers to any ritual in which making offerings into a consecrated fire is the primary action. At present, the words homa/homam and havan are interchangeable with the word Yagna.

Yagya is a ritual of sacrifice derived from the practice of Vedic times. It is performed to please the gods or to attain certain wishes. An essential element is the sacrificial fire - the divine Agni - into which oblations are poured, as everything that is offered into the fire is believed to reach the gods. A Vedic (Śrauta) yajna is typically performed by an adhvaryu priest reciting Vedic verses. Usually, there will be one or three fires in the centre of the offering ground. Among the items offered as oblations in the yajna include large quantities of ghee, milk, grains, cakes or soma. The duration of a yajna depends on the type; some can last a few minutes, hours or days and some even last for years. Some yajnas are performed privately, others with many people in attendance.

Substances and objects

Substances that are commonly used in Hindu worship include flowers, ghee, incense, kumkum, Marigold, milk, sandalwood, tulsi and vibhuti. Among objects used are the altar, banana leaves, bhog, coconuts, diya (oil lamps), fly-whisks, garlands, prasad, shankha (conch) and tilaka.

Prasad

Prasād is a mental condition of generosity, as well as a material substance that is first offered to a deity and then consumed. Literally, a gracious gift. The prasad has the deity's blessing residing within it. In contemporary Hindu religious practice in India, the desire to get prasada and have darshan are the two major motivations of pilgrimage and temple visits.

Tilaka

The tilaka, tilak or tika is a mark worn on the forehead and in some cases to the upper part of the head. Tilaka may be worn on a daily basis or for special religious occasions only, depending on different customs. The tilaka symbolizes the third eye, or mind's eye, associated with many Hindu gods, and the idea of meditation and spiritual enlightenment. In the past, tilakas were usually worn by gods, priests, ascetics, or worshippers, but is now a common practice for most Hindus. It can express which Hindu tradition one follows. It may be made with sandalwood paste, ashes (vibhuti), kumkum, sindoor, clay, or other substances.

Tree worship

There are many sacred trees in Hinduism, Peepal, Banyan, Neem, Aamla, Bael. Leaves and fruits of Bael tree are used in worshiping Lord Shiva. The trunks of the neem trees will be wrapped in decorative red cloth that has been offered to a goddess and a brass human mask will be added to the tree. Decorative paint is applied to the face, while garlands of marigolds and jasmine flowers are strung around the tree.  People worship the neem tree as Shitala for good health and protection from dangerous sicknesses. Tree worshippers tend to gravitate towards one tree in particular that they feel a connection with as an intimate individual.

Bhajan

A Bhajan is any type of Indian devotional song. It has no fixed form: it may be as simple as a mantra or kirtan or as sophisticated as the dhrupad or kriti with music based on classical ragas and talas. It is normally lyrical, expressing love for the Divine. The name, a cognate of bhakti, meaning religious devotion, suggests its importance to the bhakti movement that spread from the south of India throughout the entire subcontinent in the Moghul era.

Kirtan

Kirtan (Sanskrit: "to repeat") is call-and-response chanting or "responsory" performed in India's devotional traditions. A person performing kirtan is known as a kirtankar. Kirtan practice involves chanting hymns or mantras to the accompaniment of instruments such as the harmonium, tablas, the two-headed mrdanga or pakhawaj drum, and karatal hand cymbals.

Mantra

A mantra is a sound, syllable, word, or group of words that is considered capable of "creating transformation" (cf. spiritual transformation). Its use and type varies according to the school and philosophy associated with the mantra. Mantras originated in the Vedic tradition of India. The most basic mantra is Aum, which in Hinduism is known as the "pranava mantra," the source of all mantras.

Mantra japa was a concept of the Vedic sages that incorporates mantras as one of the main forms of puja, or worship, whose ultimate end is seen as moksha (liberation). Essentially, mantra japa means repetition of mantra, and it has become an established practice of all Hindu streams. It involves repetition of a mantra over and over again, usually in cycles of auspicious numbers (in multiples of three), the most popular being 108.

Vrata

In the context of Hinduism, the term vrata (pronunciation: vrat or brat) denotes a religious practice to carry out certain obligations with a view to achieve divine blessing for fulfillment of one or several desires. Etymologically, vrata, a Sanskrit word (and also used in several Indo-European languages), means to vow or to promise. A vrata may consist of one or more of several actions. Such actions may include complete or partial fasting on certain specific days; a Yatra (pilgrimage) to a particular place or places; a visit, darśana and puja at a particular temple or temples; recitation of mantras and prayers; performing yajnas.

Festivals

Hindus observe sacred occasions by festive observances. All festivals in Hinduism are predominantly religious in character and significance. Many festivals are seasonal. Some celebrate harvest and birth of God or heroes. Many are dedicated to Shiva and Parvati, Vishnu and Lakshmi and Brahma and Saraswati

Yatra

Yātrā ('journey', 'procession') generally means pilgrimage to holy places such as confluences of sacred rivers, places associated with Hindu epics such as the Mahabharata and Ramayana, and other sacred pilgrimage sites. Tīrtha-yātrā refers to a pilgrimage to a holy site, and is generally undertaken in groups. One who goes on a yatra is known as a yatri. A yatra is a kamya ritual; it is desirable, but not obligatory, for a Hindu to perform it.  One can go on a yatra for a variety of reasons, including festivals, to perform rituals for one's ancestors, or to obtain good karma. To traditional Hindus, the journey itself is as important as the destination, and the hardships of travel serve as an act of devotion in themselves. Visiting a sacred place is believed by the pilgrim to purify the self and bring one closer to the divine.

References

Further reading

 Fuller, C. J. (2004). The Camphor Flame: Popular Hinduism and Society in India. Princeton University Press, New Jersey. .
 Huyler, Stephen P. (2002). Meeting God: Elements of Hindu Devotion. Yale University Press, New Haven. .